Gulverd Tomashvili (born 13 October 1988) is Georgian football player. He is a defender and currently plays for FC Sioni Bolnisi in Georgia. He has represented Georgia at Under-19 and Under-21 level.

Club career
Tomashvili made three appearances for Dinamo Tbilisi in the 2006–07 season. He made his European debut for the club in July 2008, as a late substitute for Levan Khmaladze in the 3–0 win at home to NSÍ Runavík in the UEFA Champions League 1st qualifying round. He also featured in the two games against Panathinaikos in the following round. He played at right-back in the 2009 Georgian FA Cup Final, which Dinamo won on penalties after a 1–1 draw against FC Olimpi Rustavi.

References

External links
 

1988 births
Living people
Footballers from Georgia (country)
Georgia (country) under-21 international footballers
Georgia (country) international footballers
Association football defenders
FC Dinamo Tbilisi players